The Royal Tapestry Factory (Spanish: Real Fábrica de Tapices de Santa Bárbara) is a manufacturing plant located in Madrid, Spain, which was founded in 1720.

History
The factory was founded by Philip V after Spain lost its Belgian territories, and their tapestry workshops, as a result of the Peace of Utrecht. A master weaver was recruited from Antwerp.
The project was followed by a number of other mercantilist initiatives undertaken in the eighteenth century in the Madrid area to supply luxury goods. Another example was the Real Fábrica del Buen Retiro porcelain factory.

Like its French counterpart the Gobelins Manufactory, the Royal Tapestry Factory supplied the court with tapestries. While still in his 20s the painter Francisco Goya was commissioned to provide designs (known as cartoons) for tapestries to furnish El Escorial and El Pardo, two of the palaces in the Madrid region. Many of the Goya tapestry cartoons are displayed at the Museo del Prado.

Current activities
In the 1990s the factory was running at a loss and received a bail-out from public funds. It became a foundation under the auspices of the Ministry of Culture with the aim of providing a secure basis for the future. Although further issues related to profitability have been reported, the factory still produces traditional tapestries and carpets. As well as producing new pieces, it is involved in the conservation of historic textiles.

After Manuela Carmena became mayor of Madrid in 2015 issues came to light regarding the continued rent-free residence of the former owner and factory director, Livinio Stuyck, in a 700m2 duplex apartment atop the factory. There were allegations of squatting, and an attempt to impose fines.

Building
The factory was originally located at the Puerta de Santa Bárbara, a gate on the northern side of Madrid.

The factory has occupied its present site, not far from Atocha station, since the nineteenth century.  The nineteenth century building is itself is of historical interest.  It was given a heritage listing Bien de Interés Cultural in 2006.

See also
 List of Francisco Goya's tapestry cartoons
 Real Fábrica de Cristales de La Granja

References

External links 

Buildings and structures in Pacífico neighborhood, Madrid
Foundations based in Spain
Manufacturing plants in Spain
Tapestry-making operations
Bien de Interés Cultural landmarks in Madrid
1720 establishments in Spain
Organisations based in Spain with royal patronage